Jelena Kostanić and Claudine Schaul were the defending champions, but Kostanic did not compete this year. Schaul was about to team up with Émilie Loit, but had to withdraw because of a left groin strain.

Tathiana Garbin and Tina Križan won the title by defeating Gabriela Navrátilová and Michaela Paštiková 7–5, 1–6, 6–4 in the final. It was the 8th title for Garbin and the 6th title for Križan in their respective doubles careers.

Seeds

Draw

Draw

Qualifying

Seeds

Qualifiers
  Yuliya Beygelzimer /  Sandra Klösel

Qualifying draw

References
 Main and Qualifying Draws

Richard Luton Properties Canberra International Open – Doubles
2005 Richard Luton Properties Canberra Women's Classic